Edmar Castañeda (born 1978) is a Colombian harpist. He performs his own compositions as well as tapping into native music of Colombia and Venezuela.

He leads a trio with David Silliman on drums and Marshall Gilkes on trombone. He has also been a member of the Andrea Tierra Quartet with Andrea Tierra, Sam Sadigursky, and David Silliman.

Castañeda's father was Pavelid Castañeda, a harpist, singer, and teacher. Edmar Castañeda began playing the harp at the age of 13. In the mid 1990s he moved to New York City and studied jazz trumpet before returning to the harp. In 2006 he released his first solo album, Cuarto de Colores.

He has performed with Paquito D'Rivera, Simón Diaz, Lila Downs, Giovanni Hidalgo, Joe Locke, Wynton Marsalis, John Patitucci, Janis Siegel, John Scofield, Samuel Torres, Hiromi Uehara, and the United Nations Orchestra.

Other appearances
 "Hang On Mike", Candy Butchers, 2004
 "Island Life", Yerba Buena, 2005
 "La Marea", Marta Topferova, 2005
 "La Cantina", Lila Downs, 2006
 "Alma Latina", Arturo Romay, 2007
 "Melodía Verde", Andrea Tierra, 2007
 "Cuarto de Colores", 2009
 "Entre Cuerdas", 2009
 "Double Portion", 2012

References

External links

 Official site
 NPR Tiny Desk Concert February 8, 2010
 Profile of Edmar Castañeda in Arcadia magazine (in Spanish)

1978 births
Living people
Colombian composers
Male composers
Colombian harpists
Musicians from Bogotá
ACT Music artists
Telarc Records artists
ArtistShare artists